Sarah Morton may refer to:
Sarah Morton (playwright), American playwright, actor, educator and activist
Sarah Wentworth Apthorp Morton (1759–1846), American poet
Sarah Morton (footballer) (born 1998), New Zealand footballer
Sarah Morton, lead character played by Charlotte Rampling in Swimming Pool, 2003
Sarah Morton (basketball) with Wolfenbüttel Wildcats
Sarah Morton, a passenger of the Little James in 1623